Knhom Jea Neakna (English: Who Am I?) is a Cambodian television film that aired on Cambodian Television Network on April 1, 2009.

The film was directed by Parn Puong Bopha, and stars Ny Monika and Keo Sreyneang. The story depicts a foreign born female, Keo Sreyneang, attracted to a Cambodian actress, Ny Monika. The foreign traveler does everything she can to get the actress's attention while interfering the relationship of the actress and her fiancé. It has been described as first Khmer gay film.

Critical reception

With Parn Puong Bopha spending a budget of her own $20,000, the opera proved a success. Still the plot provides a more creative and idealized story promising a more diverse and unique plot-line in Khmer future films rather than the typical story of a romance between a man and a woman and his ex interfering with their relationship.

References
 http://www.lovekhmer.com/khmer-series-f237/kyom-jea-neak-na-t9193.htm

2000s Cambodian television series
2009 television films
2009 films
Cambodian television series